Silver Ridge is an unincorporated community and census-designated place (CDP) located within Berkeley Township, in Ocean County, New Jersey, United States. As of the 2010 United States Census, the CDP's population was 1,133.

Geography
According to the United States Census Bureau, the CDP had a total area of 0.469 square miles (1.215 km2), including 0.465 square miles (1.205 km2) of land and 0.004 square miles (0.010 km2) of water (0.83%).

Demographics

Census 2010

Census 2000
As of the 2000 United States Census there were 1,211 people, 770 households, and 372 families living in the CDP. The population density was 1,062.7/km2 (2,755.0/mi2). There were 827 housing units at an average density of 725.7/km2 (1,881.4/mi2). The racial makeup of the CDP was 99.26% White, 0.33% African American, 0.08% Native American, 0.25% Asian, 0.08% from other races. Hispanic or Latino of any race were 1.24% of the population.

There were 770 households, out of which none had children under the age of 18 living with them, 41.8% were married couples living together, 5.5% had a female householder with no husband present, and 51.6% were non-families. 48.6% of all households were made up of individuals, and 41.4% had someone living alone who was 65 years of age or older. The average household size was 1.57 and the average family size was 2.11.

In the CDP the population was spread out, with 0.1% under the age of 18, 0.5% from 18 to 24, 3.4% from 25 to 44, 22.6% from 45 to 64, and 73.4% who were 65 years of age or older. The median age was 72 years. For every 100 females, there were 68.7 males. For every 100 females age 18 and over, there were 68.5 males.

The median income for a household in the CDP was $29,671, and the median income for a family was $37,281. Males had a median income of $42,708 versus $19,911 for females. The per capita income for the CDP was $22,403. None of the families and 3.9% of the population were living below the poverty line, including no under eighteens and 5.5% of those over 64.

References

Berkeley Township, New Jersey
Census-designated places in Ocean County, New Jersey
Populated places in the Pine Barrens (New Jersey)